Alexandros "Alex" Liatsos is a Cypriot professional basketball player who currently plays for Proteas AEL of the Cyprus Basketball Division 1. He played college basketball with the Ohio Bobcats men's basketball team and Olney Central College from 1998 to 2002. Liatsos also represents Cyprus in international competition and FIBA events. He has competed with the national team on multiple occasions.

References 

1980 births
Living people
AEL Limassol B.C. players
Apollon Limassol BC players
Cypriot men's basketball players
Cypriot expatriate basketball people in the United States
Ilysiakos B.C. players
Junior college men's basketball players in the United States
Ohio Bobcats men's basketball players
Power forwards (basketball)
Rethymno B.C. players
Sportspeople from Limassol
UJAP Quimper 29 players